Star Wars: Phasma is a Star Wars novel by Delilah S. Dawson, published by Del Rey Books on September 1, 2017 as part of the Journey to Star Wars: The Last Jedi publishing initiative. It explores the backstory of Captain Phasma, the stormtrooper leader introduced in the 2015 film Star Wars: The Force Awakens.

The novel was announced at the Star Wars Celebration in April 2017, among several works related to The Force Awakens sequel film The Last Jedi. A comic book miniseries called Star Wars: Captain Phasma, exploring Phasma's adventures between the films, was announced at the same time. A stand-alone sequel novel, Star Wars: Galaxy's Edge: Black Spire, was released on August 17, 2019.

Star Wars: Phasma is available as an audiobook and e-book.

Plot
Resistance spy Vi Moradi is captured and brought aboard the First Order Star DestroyerAbsolution, where she is interrogated in secret by Cardinal, a stormtrooper captain in red armor. Cardinal seeks information to use against his nemesis, the powerful Captain Phasma. Buying time to stay alive and hopefully effect her escape, Vi tells the extended story of Phasma's origins on the ruined planet Parnassos, as told to her by Siv, one of Phasma's former warriors.

Publication
The novel was announced at the Star Wars Celebration in April 2017, among several works related to The Force Awakens sequel film The Last Jedi. A comic book miniseries called Star Wars: Captain Phasma, exploring Phasma's adventures between the films, was announced at the same time.

The novel was published by Del Rey Books on September 1, 2017.

References

External links
 

2017 American novels
2017 science fiction novels
American post-apocalyptic novels
Books based on Star Wars
Del Rey books
Delilah S. Dawson works